

Composition

The canton of Béziers-1 is an administrative division of the Hérault department, southern France. Its borders were modified at the French canton reorganisation which came into effect in March 2015. Its seat is in Béziers.

It consists of the following communes:
Béziers (partly)
Lespignan
Nissan-lez-Enserune
Sérignan
Valras-Plage
Vendres

Councillors

Pictures of the canton

References

Cantons of Hérault